Carlos Bernardo "Carlitos" Chimomole (born April 4, 1984 in Maputo) is a Mozambican footballer who plays for Liga Muçulmana de Maputo and Mozambique. His position is midfielder.

Clubs
2004-2007:  Desportivo de Maputo
2007-2008:  Supersport United
2008-2012:  Liga Muçulmana de Maputo
2013:  Ferroviário de Beira
2014:  CD Maxaquene
2015:  Desportivo de Maputo
2016: Ferroviário de Maputo
2016-2017:  UP Lichinga
2018:  Ferroviário de Nacala

Honours
Liga Muçulmana de Maputo
Moçambola: Champions - 2010, 2011
Ferroviário de Beira
Moçambola: Champions - 2013
CD Maxaquene
Moçambola: Champions - 2014

External links

1984 births
Living people
Mozambican footballers
Mozambique international footballers
Association football midfielders
GD Maputo players
SuperSport United F.C. players
Liga Desportiva de Maputo players
Clube Ferroviário da Beira players
C.D. Maxaquene players
FC Lichinga players
Clube Ferroviário de Nacala players